Man Seeking Woman is an American surrealist romantic comedy television series that aired for three seasons on FXX from January 14, 2015, to March 8, 2017. The series is set in Chicago, about a naïve and soft-spoken man in his 20s named Josh Greenberg (played by Jay Baruchel), who finds himself in several surreal and awkward circumstances while trying to find love.

The series is based on a book of short stories, The Last Girlfriend on Earth, by Simon Rich, who is also the series creator, executive producer, and showrunner. Jonathan Krisel, Andrew Singer, and Lorne Michaels are also executive producers, with Broadway Video, Allagash Industries and FXP (formerly FX Productions) as production companies. It has received generally positive reception from critics.

On April 4, 2017, the show was canceled after three seasons.

Premise
Most episode plots are based on relatable conflicts and struggles of entering/maintaining a relationship; however, these conflicts are taken to absurd and literal extremes. The show centers on Josh Greenberg, who struggles finding love after a break-up with his long term girlfriend Maggie. His mature and successful older sister Liz often tries to help him enter into a serious relationship, and his sex-crazed best friend Mike often tries to help him with solely having sex. Josh's efforts oftentimes lead him into surreal and awkward circumstances such as going on a date with an actual troll, physically misplacing his penis, or meeting a Japanese monster composed of human penises. Sometimes Josh is successful in finding a girlfriend; however, these relationships usually only survive for one episode.

Cast and characters

Main
 Jay Baruchel as Josh Greenberg, a naïve and soft-spoken 27-year-old man working a temp job. He struggles to find love, following a break-up from a long relationship. He is sometimes used as a straight man when absurd and surreal things happen.
 Eric André as Mike Scaggs, Josh's laid-back best friend who has an easier time with girls than Josh. He often attempts to help Josh, however, he is more interested in helping him have sex as opposed to entering into a serious relationship.
 Britt Lower as Liz Greenberg, Josh's protective and caring older sister who also tries to help Josh. Her methods of helping are more rational and down-to-earth than Mike's; they are more driven to getting Josh into a serious relationship. She has a condescending view of Mike, who in turn doesn't seem to have an opinion of her.
 Maya Erskine as Maggie (season 1), Josh's ex-girlfriend, who breaks up with him at the start of the series.
 Katie Findlay as Lucy (season 3), Josh's girlfriend and later wife.

Recurring

 Robin Duke as Patti Greenberg, Josh and Liz's mother.
 Mark McKinney as Tom Greenberg, Josh and Liz's step-father.
 Jeff Pangman as Charles Powell, Josh's boss.
 Ennis Esmer as Leo (season 1), Liz's boyfriend.
 Rosa Salazar as Rosa Mendes (season 2), a co-worker of Josh's that he and Mike both fall in love with.

Production
On June 19, 2013, FXX ordered a pilot episode for Man Seeking Woman from Simon Rich, directed by Jonathan Krisel. On February 6, 2014, Jay Baruchel was cast as the lead character, Josh Greenberg. On March 20, Eric André, Britt Lower, and Maya Erskine were announced as the remaining principal cast members. On July 2, the network announced it had picked up the series for a 10-episode series order, as well as its principal cast and production crew. On October 31, Miles Fisher was cast in a recurring role. The series is filmed in Toronto, Ontario, Canada. On March 3, 2015, it was renewed for a 10-episode second season. On April 12, 2016, FX announced it was renewed for a 10-episode third season.

Episodes

Reception
Man Seeking Woman has been met with positive reviews from critics. Rotten Tomatoes gives the first season of the show a rating of 82%, based on 33 reviews, with an average rating of 6.73/10. The site's critical consensus states, "Amusingly surrealistic and enjoyably odd, Man Seeking Woman is easy to fall for, taking a ridiculously funny approach to a common theme." On Metacritic, the season has a score of 66 out of 100, based on 27 critics, indicating "generally favorable reviews".

The second season received positive reviews. On Rotten Tomatoes, it has a rating of 100% based on 8 reviews with an average rating of 8.0 out of 10.

The third season also received positive reviews. On Rotten Tomatoes, it has a rating of 100% based on 13 reviews with an average rating of 8.83 out of 10. The site's critical consensus states, "Man Seeking Woman explores new avenues of storytelling in season 3, while maintaining its excellent absurdist humor and imaginative dealings with relatable relationship issues." On Metacritic, the season has a score of 89 out of 100, based on 5 critics, indicating "universal acclaim".

References

External links
 
 
 

2010s American romantic comedy television series
2010s American single-camera sitcoms
2010s American surreal comedy television series
2015 American television series debuts
2017 American television series endings
English-language television shows
FXX original programming
Television shows set in Chicago
Television shows filmed in Toronto
Television shows based on books
Television series by Broadway Video
Television series created by Simon Rich
Adaptations of works by Simon Rich